This is a list of yearly Mountain East Conference football standings.

Mid-America standings

References

Standings
Mountain East Conference
College football-related lists